The 2018 Collingwood Football Club season was the club's 122nd season of senior competition in the Australian Football League (AFL). The club also fielded its reserves team in the VFL and a women's team in the AFL Women's competition.

Squad
 Players are listed by guernsey number, and 2018 statistics are for AFL regular season and finals series matches during the 2018 AFL season only. Career statistics include a player's complete AFL career, which, as a result, means that a player's debut and part or whole of their career statistics may be for another club. Statistics are correct as of the Grand Final of the 2018 season (29 September 2018) and are taken from AFL Tables.

Squad changes

In

Out

AFL season

Pre-season matches

Regular season

Finals series

Ladder

Awards & Milestones

AFL Awards
 Anzac Medal – Adam Treloar (Round 5)
 2018 22under22 selection – Jordan De Goey
 2018 22under22 selection – Jaidyn Stephenson
 2018 22under22 selection – Tom Phillips
2018 AFL Rising Star – Jaidyn Stephenson
 2018 All-Australian team – Brodie Grundy, Steele Sidebottom

AFL Award Nominations
 Round 3 – 2018 AFL Rising Star nomination – Sam Murray
 Round 4 – 2018 AFL Rising Star nomination – Jaidyn Stephenson
 2018 All-Australian team 40-man squad – Jordan De Goey, Brodie Grundy, Scott Pendlebury, Steele Sidebottom

Club Awards
  – Steele Sidebottom & Brodie Grundy
  – Scott Pendlebury
  – Jack Crisp
  – Taylor Adams
  – Marty Hore
  – Lynden Dunn
  – Jaidyn Stephenson
  – Jordan De Goey
  – Jack Crisp
  – Taylor Adams

Milestones
 Round 1 – Sam Murray (AFL debut)
 Round 1 – Jaidyn Stephenson (AFL debut)
 Round 3 – Taylor Adams (100 AFL games)
 Round 3 – Travis Varcoe (50 Collingwood games)
 Round 6 – Flynn Appleby (AFL debut)
 Round 7 – Darcy Moore (50 games)
 Round 7 – Adam Treloar (50 Collingwood games)
 Round 9 – Josh Thomas (50 games)
 Round 9 – Jeremy Howe (50 Collingwood games)
 Round 9 – Jordan De Goey (50 goals)
 Round 11 – Brody Mihocek (AFL debut)
 Round 15 – Brayden Sier (AFL debut)
 Round 15 – Josh Thomas (50 goals)
 Round 16 – Steele Sidebottom (200 games)
 Round 16 – Levi Greenwood (50 Collingwood games)
 Round 17 – Jack Crisp (100 AFL games)
 Round 18 – Will Hoskin-Elliott (50 Collingwood goals)
 Round 19 – Brodie Grundy (100 games)
 Round 20 – Jack Madgen (AFL debut)
 Round 21 – Chris Mayne (200 AFL goals)
 Round 22 – Nathan Murphy (AFL debut)
 Round 22 – Travis Varcoe (200 AFL games)
 Semi-Final – Will Hoskin-Elliott (100 AFL goals)
 Preliminary Final – Mason Cox (50 goals)
 Grand Final – Will Hoskin-Elliott (100 AFL games)
 Grand Final – Tom Phillips (50 games)

VFL season

Pre-season matches

Regular season

Finals series

Ladder

Women's season

Pre-season matches

Regular season

Ladder

Squad
 Players are listed by guernsey number, and 2018 statistics are for AFL Women's regular season and finals series matches during the 2018 AFL Women's season only. Career statistics include a player's complete AFL Women's career, which, as a result, means that a player's debut and part or whole of their career statistics may be for another club. Statistics are correct as of Round 7 of the 2018 season (18 March 2018) and are taken from Australian Football.

Squad changes
In

Out

League awards
 Rising Star – Chloe Molloy

Club Awards
 Best and fairest – Chloe Molloy
 Leading goalkicker – Christina Bernardi (9 goals)
 VFLW best and fairest - Jaimee Lambert

VFL Women's
In 2018, Collingwood fielded a team in the VFL Women's League for the first time. Most of Collingwood's AFL Women's list play for the club in the VFLW, though the majority of the team is made up of players who haven't been drafted to an AFLW club. The team won the minor premiership, though would go on to lose in the preliminary final to Geelong.

Notes
 Key
 H ^ Home match.
 A ^ Away match.

 Notes
Collingwood's scores are indicated in bold font.

References

External links
 Official website of the Collingwood Football Club
 Official website of the Australian Football League

2018
Collingwood Football Club
Collingwood